Marios is a given name. Notable people with the name include:

Marios Agathokleous (born 1974), retired Cypriot football striker
Marios Batis (born 1980), Greek professional basketball player
Marios Chakkas (Greek: Μάριος Χάκκας; 1931-1972), Greek author
Marios Demetriades (Greek: Μάριος Δημητριάδης; born 1971), Cypriot politician 
Marios Demetriou (born 1992, Greek: Μάριος Δημητρίου), professional football player
Marios Elia (born 1979), retired Cypriot professional footballer 
For the footballer born in 1996, see Marios Elia (footballer born 1996).
Marios Elia (Greek: Μάριος Ηλία, 1996), Cypriot footballer 
Marios Garoyian (Greek: Μάριος Καρογιάν; Armenian: Մարիոս Կարոյեան; born 1961), Cypriot-Armenian politician
 Marios Georgiou (gymnast) (born 1997), Cypriot gymnast
Marios Giourdas (born 1973), former Greek male volleyball player 
Marios Grapsas (born 1998), Greek individual trampolinist 
Marios Hadjiandreou (Greek: Μάριος Χατζηανδρέου; born 1962), Cypriot triple jumper
Marios Kapotsis (Greek: Μάριος Καπότσης; born 1991), Greek water polo player
Marios Karas (born 1974), retired Cypriot football defender
Marios Kyriazis (Greek: Μάριος Κυριαζής; born 1956), medical doctor and gerontologist 
Marios Lekkas (Greek: Μάριος Λέκκας; born 1979), Greek male model
Marios Leousis (1936–2011), Greek magician, appeared in several post-war cabarets and toured through Europe
Marios Loizides (1928–1988), Greek visual artist.
Marios Louka (Greek: Μάριος Λουκά; born 1982), Cypriot footballer 
Marios Matalon (Greek: Μάριος Ματαλών; born 1989), Greek basketball player
Marios Matsakis (born 1954), Cypriot politician and former Member of the European Parliament
Marios Nicolaou (Greek: Μάριος Νικολάου; born 1983), Cypriot footballer
Marios Oikonomou (Greek: Μάριος Οικονόμου; born 1992), Greek professional footballer 
Marios Pechlivanis (Greek: Μάριος Πεχλιβάνης; born 1995), Cypriot footballer 
Marios Siampanis (Greek: Μάριος Σιαμπάνης; born 1999), Greek footballer
Marios Stylianou (born 1993), Cypriot international footballer 
Marios Tokas (Greek: Μάριος Τόκας; 1954–2008), Cypriot composer of traditional music 
Marios Varvoglis (Greek: Μάριος Βάρβογλης; 1885–1967), Greek composer
Marios Vrousai (Greek: Μάριος Βρουσάι; born 1998), Greek footballer

Greek masculine given names